Peller is a surname. Notable people with the surname include:

Clara Peller (1902–1987), American manicurist and actress
Joseph Peller (born 1953), American artist and teacher
Gary Peller (born 1955), American philosopher
Shina Peller (born 1976), Nigerian entrepreneur, politician, and industrialist